Huntley is a former incorporated and now geographic township in Carleton County in eastern Ontario, Canada.

Huntley was located in the western part of the county, bordered to the northwest by Fitzroy Township, to the northeast by March Township, to the southwest by Ramsay Township and to the southeast by Goulbourn Township. It includes the communities of Carp, Corkery, Huntley, Manion Corners, and Westwood.

According to the Canada 2021 Census, the Township had a population of 10,922.

History
The township was surveyed in 1818 and the first settlers arrived shortly thereafter.  The township was incorporated in 1850. The first settlers in the area were immigrants from Ireland in the early 19th century. Huntley took its name from Huntly Castle, associated with Charlotte Lennox, Duchess of Richmond, whose husband Charles served as Governor General of British North America from 1818 to 1819.

By 1866, there was a Post Office in the township of Huntley and John Graham served as postmaster.

In 1974, it was amalgamated with Torbolton and Fitzroy to form West Carleton. In 2001, West Carleton became part of the new city of Ottawa.

Reeves
1850 J.E. Fenton
1853 Henry McBride
1862 John Holmes
1869 John Caldwell
1874 Edward Armstrong
1875 John Holmes
1876 Edward Armstrong
1889 George Nelson Kidd
1894 A. Hodgkins
1897 n/a
1907 G.A. Hodgkins
1911 Robert Cox
1923 William Rivington
1947 William J. Cox
1949 E.F. Johnston
1956 J.A. Boyd
1968 Glen Rivington

See also
List of townships in Ontario

References

External links 
 Huntley Community Association website
 Huntley Township Historical Society website

Former municipalities now in Ottawa
Geographic townships in Ontario
Populated places disestablished in 1974